X.32 is an old ITU-T standard published in 1984 for connecting to an X.25 network by dial-up. It defines how the network identifies the terminal for billing and security purposes.

Further reading

External links
ITU-T Recommendation X.32

ITU-T recommendations
ITU-T X Series Recommendations
X.25